Bernard Toublanc-Michel (born 6 December 1927) is a French film director and screenwriter. His 1964 film La pasta linguine was entered into the 14th Berlin International Film Festival.

Selected filmography
 La Difficulté d'être infidèle (1964)
 Malicious Pleasure (1975)
 Julien Fontanes, magistrat (1980)

References

External links

1927 births
Possibly living people
French film directors
French male screenwriters
French screenwriters